Malta station is a station stop for the Amtrak Empire Builder in Malta, Montana. The station, platform, and parking are owned by BNSF Railway.

Bibliography

Notes and references

External links 

Malta Amtrak Station (USA RailGuide – TrainWeb)

Amtrak stations in Montana
Buildings and structures in Phillips County, Montana
Former Great Northern Railway (U.S.) stations
1893 establishments in Montana
Railway stations in the United States opened in 1893